Georges Parcq (1874-1939) was a French architect who worked in Cairo, Egypt from 1910 to 1939. Among his famous works are the Sednaoui Emporium department store  in Cairo, the Alexandria Opera House, the Cairo Stock Exchange and the Villa Minost from 1931 in Cairo.

References

1874 births
1939 deaths
20th-century French architects
École des Beaux-Arts alumni
French expatriates in Egypt